The Bridgewater Curling Club is a curling club and facility in Bridgewater, Nova Scotia.

History
The club was founded in 1907, and female curlers were permitted to join in 1910.

Provincial champions

Men's
Teams from the Bridgewater Curling Club have won the Nova Scotia Men's Chahmpionship nine times, earning the right to represent Nova Scotia at the Brier, Canada's national men's championship.

Mixed
Teams from the Bridgewater Curling Club have won the provincial mixed championship three times, earning the right to represent Nova Scotia at the Canadian Mixed Curling Championship.

Junior men's
Teams from the Bridgewater Curling Club have won the provincial men's junior championships 10 times, earning the right to represent Nova Scotia at the Canadian Junior Curling Championships. The 1993 champion team, skipped by Shawn Adams won the Canadian juniors that year, but could not represent Canada at the 1993 World Junior Championships due to alcohol violations.

Junior women's
Teams from the Bridgewater Curling Club have won the provincial women's junior championships once, earning the right to represent Nova Scotia at the Canadian Junior Curling Championships.

Senior men's
Teams from the Bridgewater Curling Club have won the provincial senior men's championship twice, earning the right to represent Nova Scotia at the Canadian Senior Curling Championships.

Senior women's
Teams from the Bridgewater Curling Club have won the provincial senior women's championship once, in 1970 prior to the creation of the women's Canadian Senior Curling Championship. The team consisted of Pauline Oickle, Esther Bond, Kate Turple and Gladys Conrad.

Men's Curling Club championships
Teams from the Bridgewater Curling Club have won the men's provincial curling club championships twice, earning the right to represent Nova Scotia at the Canadian Curling Club Championships. The 2021 championship team, skipped by Nick Deagle won the national championships as well.

References

Curling clubs in Canada
Bridgewater, Nova Scotia
Sports clubs established in 1907
1907 establishments in Nova Scotia
Curling in Nova Scotia
Sports venues in Nova Scotia